Asaph (Hebrew: אָסַף) is an ancient name that means "God has gathered" and may refer to:

 Asaph (biblical figure), the name of several Biblical figures
Psalms of Asaph
 Asaph the Jew, sixth-century Jewish physician, author of:
Book of Assaf
 Saint Asaph, first bishop of the diocese of Saint Asaph in Wales
 Diocese of St Asaph
 St Asaph, a city in North Wales
 Asaph (album)
 Asaph Hall, nineteenth century astronomer
 Asaph Hall Jr., son of the above
 Asaph Fipke, Canadian animator
 St. Asaph Road, Croydon